Bjuv Municipality is a municipality in Skåne County in South Sweden in southern Sweden. Its seat is located in the town of Bjuv.

The amalgamations connected to the 1971 local government reform in Sweden took place in this area in 1974, when "old" Bjuv (a market town (köping) since 1946) was amalgamated with Billesholm and Ekeby.

History
The municipal arms depicts a mining torch lighting up a dark area. The reason is that Bjuv Municipality has had a coal mining industry since the 18th century. In the end of the 19th century, the clay industry flourished, based on the coal.

Localities
There were two localities in the municipality in 2018.

Politics
After 2018 election composition of the municipal council was as follows:

References

External links

Municipalities of Skåne County